Tatiana Panina Shishkova (born 20 December 1969) is a road cyclist. As of 2008 she is from Russia and since 2010 she is representing Belarus. She represented Belarus at the 2010 UCI Road World Championships.

References

External links
 profile at Procyclingstats.com

1969 births
Belarusian female cyclists
Russian female cyclists
Living people
Place of birth missing (living people)